An établissement public à caractère industriel et commercial (EPIC) is, in France, a category of public undertaking. It includes state-controlled entities of an industrial or commercial nature, including some research institutes and infrastructure operators. Some former French colonies, such as Algeria, Burkina Faso and Mauritania also use this term for such agencies.

EPICs were first recognized as a specific form of public agencies by the Court of Arbitration's (French: Tribunal des conflits) case law in 1921. In accordance with Article 34 of the French Constitution, they can only be created by a law. Not every company whose capital is held by the state or a state-owned entity is an EPIC. An EPIC is under special laws which do not apply to enterprises under private company law, even if the capital of those companies is held by the state.

List of EPICs

Current
 Airport Basel-Mulhouse
 Commissariat à l'énergie atomique (CEA), the energy research agency
 CNES, the French government space agency
 BRGM, the French geological survey
 Centre Scientifique et Technique du Batiment (CSTB), the scientific and technical centre for building
 Ifremer, "Institut français de recherche pour l'exploitation de la mer", an oceanographic institute
 Institut de radioprotection et de sûreté nucléaire, (IRSN) the French institute for radioprotection and nuclear safety
 Laboratoire national de métrologie et d'essais, a standards laboratory
 Monnaie de Paris, the French mint authority
 ONF, the national forestry service
 ONERA, the aerospace laboratory
 CIRAD,Centre de coopération internationale en recherche agronomique pour le développement, Agricultural Development Centre 
 Opéra national de Paris
 RATP
 Réseau ferré de France (RFF), the national railway infrastructure company
 Voies navigables de France (VNF), the inland waterways authority
 ENSCI-Les Ateliers, an industrial design school

Former EPICs
Former public service operations which have been turned into companies governed by private law include:
 Aéroports de Paris (ADP)
 EDF, the national electricity company
 GDF, the national gas company
 Seita, the former tobacco monopoly
 Société nationale des chemins de fer français, the national railway network (name remains the same with no "S.A." suffix added)

Legal basis in external documents from Legifrance
Dispositions générales applicables aux établissements du secteur public
Régime comptable des établissements publics à caractère industriel et commercial

References

Science and technology in France
Government agencies of France
Government-owned companies of France